The Alvah Kittredge House is an historic house in the highlands of the Roxbury neighborhood of Boston, Massachusetts.  The -story Greek Revival mansion was built in 1836 for Alvah Kittredge, a leading real estate developer of the time.  It was originally located at the site of the Roxbury Low Fort, a defensive earthworks of the American Revolutionary War, and was moved to its present site after 1896.  It was the home of noted Boston architect Nathaniel J. Bradlee for 30 years.

The house was listed on the National Register of Historic Places in 1973 and designated a Boston Landmark by the Boston Landmarks Commission in 2016.

See also
National Register of Historic Places listings in southern Boston, Massachusetts

References

Houses completed in 1836
Houses in Boston
National Register of Historic Places in Boston
Historic district contributing properties in Massachusetts
Landmarks in Roxbury, Boston
Houses on the National Register of Historic Places in Suffolk County, Massachusetts